The Samsung NX 18-200mm F3.5-6.3 ED OIS is an interchangeable superzoom lens announced by Samsung on February 21, 2011.

References
http://www.dpreview.com/products/samsung/lenses/samsung_18-200_3p5-6p3/specifications

18-200
Superzoom lenses
Camera lenses introduced in 2011